The 1903–04 Sheffield Shield season was the 12th season of the Sheffield Shield, the domestic first-class cricket competition of Australia. New South Wales won the championship.

Table

Statistics

Most Runs
Reggie Duff 492

Most Wickets
Bert Hopkins 21

References

Sheffield Shield
Sheffield Shield
Sheffield Shield seasons